State Counselling Board (SCB), Haryana  is a unit of the Government of Haryana  in India that looks after the school education in the state of Haryana.

Introduction 
The department is responsible for providing counseling to hundreds of thousand students for admission to several thousand professional courses every year in universities in Haryana state.

See also

 Haryana Board of School Education
 Engineering colleges in Haryana
 List of institutions of higher education in Haryana
 List of schools in Hisar
 List of Universities and Colleges in Hisar
 Rajiv Gandhi Education City, Sonipat
 List of engineering colleges affiliated to Kurukshetra University, Kurukshetra
 List of colleges affiliated to Kurukshetra University, Kurukshetra
 List of agricultural universities in India
 List of deemed universities
 List of universities in India
 Department of Elementary Education, Haryana Official website
 Director Secondary Education, Haryana Official website
 Department of Higher Education, Haryana Official website
 Department of School Education, Haryana Official website
 Haryana Tourism
 Haryana Roadways

External links
HBSE Official Website
State Counselling Board (SCB), Haryana Official Website
Government of Haryana Official Website
 HarSamadhan Haryana Govt's online Complaints portal

References

Education in Haryana
State agencies of Haryana
Government agencies established in 1999
1999 establishments in Haryana